Parachela maculicauda is a freshwater fish in the genus Parachela, family Cyprinidae and order Cypriniformes.  It occurs in lowland rivers and swamps in small groups. Found at the water surface in small and medium-sized rivers with nearby areas of floodplain forest. Feeds on plankton. It is found in the basins of the Mekong River and Chao Praya as well as the Malay Peninsula and on the island of Sumatra and in Sarawak, it has also been possibly recorded from the Mae Klong It is a small fish growing to a maximum length of 6 cm and is characterised by two blotches near the tips of each lobe of the caudal fin. It is of limited interest in fisheries but is used to make prahok. It is also of little interest to the aquarium trade.

References

Cyprinid fish of Asia
Fish of Thailand
Fish described in 1934